Mona Høvring (born 8 October 1962), is a Norwegian writer, born in Haugesund. She was awarded the Norwegian Critics Prize for Literature for 2018.

Career
Høvring made her literary debut in 1998 with the poetry collection IIK!! Ein dialog. She followed up with the collection Ensomme badedager og andre dikt in 2000. Her novel Noe som hjelper came in 2004, and further the poetry collections Helt vanlige mirakler in 2006, and Å Paradis in 2008. In 2012 she issued the novel Venterommet i Atlanteren, which has also been translated into French and Danish. Her novel Camillas lange netter from 2013 was shortlisted for the Nordic Council Literature Prize. She was awarded the Norwegian Critics Prize for Literature for best literary work for 2018, for her novel Fordi Venus passerte en alpefiol den dagen jeg blei født.

Awards
 (2012)
Norwegian Critics Prize for Literature for best adult fiction (2018)

References

1962 births
Living people
People from Haugesund
Norwegian women novelists
Norwegian women poets
21st-century Norwegian novelists
21st-century Norwegian women writers